Okwo is an African surname. Notable people with this surname include:

 Jean Marie Okwo Bele (born 1957), Congolese physician and epidemiologist
 Michael Okwo (born 1985), British-American American football player
 Mildred Okwo (born 1966), Nigerian film director and producer

Surnames of African origin